Polatuzumab vedotin (INN; brand name Polivy, is an antibody-drug conjugate or ADC designed for the treatment of cancer.  The US Food and Drug Administration approved polatuzumab vedotin in June 2019 for treatment of diffuse large B-cell lymphoma when used in combination with bendamustine and rituximab after at least two prior therapies. The drug was developed by Genentech (subsidiary of Roche).

History 
In June 2019, polatuzumab vedotin-piiq was approved in the United States in combination with the chemotherapy bendamustine and a rituximab product (a combination known as "BR"), to treat adult patients with diffuse large B-cell lymphoma (DLBCL) that has progressed or returned after at least two prior therapies. Polatuzumab vedotin is a novel antibody-drug conjugate, and DLBCL is the most common type of non-Hodgkin lymphoma.

The U.S. Food and Drug Administration (FDA) granted accelerated approval to polatuzumab vedotin used in combination with the chemotherapy bendamustine and a rituximab product. Further clinical trials are required to verify and describe the clinical benefit of polatuzumab vedotin.

The FDA approved polatuzumab vedotin based primarily on evidence from one clinical trial (NCT02257567) that was conducted in the United States, Canada, Europe, and Asia. Patients who participated in the trial had lymphoma that came back or did not improve after prior treatment.

The FDA granted the application of polatuzumab vedotin-piiq breakthrough therapy designation, priority review designation, and orphan drug designation. The FDA granted the approval of Polivy to Genentech.

Polatuzumab vedotin was approved for medical use in the European Union in January 2020 as a second-line treatment. The European Medicines Agency (EMA) designated polatuzumab vedotin an orphan medicine in April 2018. In March 2022, the European Medicines Agency's Committee for Medicinal Products for Human Use recommended  Polatuzumab vedotin, in combination with R-CHP or R-CHOP, as a primary treatment. In February 2023, polatuzumab vedotin was recommended by the National Institute for Health and Care Excellence (NICE) to be used in combination with rituximab, cyclophosphamide, doxorubicin and prednisolone (R-CHP) for untreated diffuse large B-cell lymphoma (DLBCL).

References

External links 
 
 

Breakthrough therapy
Genentech brands
Hoffmann-La Roche brands
Antibody-drug conjugates
Orphan drugs
Monoclonal antibodies for tumors